Stop That Girl: A Novel in Short Stories is a 2005 novel by Elizabeth McKenzie. It is a series of nine short stories telling the life of Ann Ransom, the narrator, from when she is an eight-year-old girl through to her failed marriage.

Reception
The New York Times in its review of Stop That Girl described McKenzie as "an accomplished humorist and a developed stylist, and she wastes no time dazzling the reader with her clean direct language, her simple but searing use of metaphor and her unflinching eye." and although finding the writing of the last two stories "cumbersome, overwrought and overdetermined" concluded that "McKenzie still feels like an original."

Stop That Girl has also been reviewed by January Magazine, Kirkus Reviews, Publishers Weekly. Booklist, Library Journal, and the School Library Journal.

References

2005 American novels